BAI or Bai may refer to:

BAI

Organizations 
BAI Communications, telecommunications infrastructure company
BAI (organization), professional organization for financial services in the United States
Badminton Association of India, India's governing body for badminton
Banco Angolano de Investimentos, a bank in Angola
Board of Audit and Inspection, supreme audit institution of South Korea
Brittany Ferries, a French shipping company
Broadcasting Authority of Ireland, regulator of broadcasting in Ireland
Bureau of Animal Industry, formerly an agency of the United States Department of Agriculture
WBAI, a listener-supported radio station in New York City

Science 

Beck Anxiety Inventory, a psychological assessment tool
Body adiposity index, a method of measuring body fat in humans
Brain-specific angiogenesis inhibitor 1

Other uses 

 BAI (file format), file format for performing electronic cash management balance reporting
 BA-I, a Soviet armoured car
 Battlefield air interdiction, a military tactic
 Bachelor of Engineering aka Baccalaureus in Arte Ingeniaria, an academic degree

Bai

People
Bai (surname), a Chinese surname
Marcus Bai (born 1972), Papua New Guinean rugby league player
Seremaia Bai (born 1979), Fijian rugby union player

Places
Bai, Iran, a village in Razavi Khorasan Province, Iran
Bai, Nepal, village in Bajura District, Nepal
Bai Prefecture, a prefecture in Imperial China
Baicheng County, Xinjiang, China, known in Uyghur as Bai
Băi, a village in Vidra Commune, Alba County, Romania
Băi, a river in Dâmbovița and Giurgiu Counties, Romania
Mbeli Bai, Congo

Ethnicity or language
Bai people, a Chinese ethnic group
Bai language, language spoken by Bai people
Bai people (South Sudan), ethnic group in South Sudan
Bai language (South Sudan), a Ubangian language
Bai (Kibay), a dialect of the Bantu Sakata language
Balong (Bai), a variety of the Bantu Bafaw-Balong language
Bamileke languages (ISO 639 alpha-3, bai), a group of languages spoken in Cameroon

Other uses
Bai (decoration), an imperial Vietnamese decoration for merit set with rubies
Bai (house), a traditional village meeting house
Bai (suffix), a naming tradition in Maratha and Rajput dynasties
Obai, pre-colonial rulers of the Temne state of Koya
Bai Brands, a beverage company

See also
Bai Island, an island in Malaysia
Bai Bing (disambiguation)
Bai Di (disambiguation)
Bai Lang (disambiguation)
Bais (disambiguation)
Pai (surname)